Chromatorida is an order of pigmented intraerythrocytic parasitic alveolates erected by Jacques Euzéby in 1988.

It has one suborder - Laveraniina with two families - Plasmodiidae and Haemoproteidae.

References

Apicomplexa orders